The Organization for the Reconstruction of the Communist Party of Greece (Orgánosi yia tin Anasigkrótisi tou Komounistikoú Kómmatos Elládas), mostly known by its acronym OAKKE, is a minor Greek political party known for its strong anti-Russian positions.

Secretary of the Central Committee of OAKKE is Elias Zafiropoulos.

OAKKE was established in 1985 and is part of the Greek far-left, and it stems from the multiple splits of the Greek Maoist movement. It is best known for its pro-industrialisation views, as it considers industrial growth a prerequisite for the development of the working class, which is required for the socialist revolution.

Another political feature of OAKKE is its views regarding an alleged Russian conspiracy to corrupt the left and install its own world regime. They argue that Russian imperialism is today the main threat for all humanity, just like
Hitler was in the 1930s and 1940s.

OAKKE supports the Chechnya independence from Russia, which OAKKE sees as the organizer of the September 11, 2001 attacks.

History

The Organization for the Reconstruction of the Communist Party of Greece (OAKKE) is a Greek political organization of Marxist - Leninist - Maoist ideology. It was founded on July 20, 1985, by former members of EKKE – MLKKE party (EKKE was the “Revolutionary Communist Movement of Greece” and MLKKE was the “Marxist – Leninist Communist Party of Greece”, both of Maoist orientation), who left the party in June of that year. In the formation of OAKKE took part namely the whole Party Organisation of Piraeus of EKKE – MLKKE, all the members of EKKE - MLKKE who, before the unification of the two parties in 1982 were members of EKKE except for two, and some other members and cadres of EKKE - MLKKE emanating from the pre-1982 MLKKE from the rest of the country.

Strategy

The political strategy of OAKKE is the reconstruction of the old revolutionary Communist Party of Greece (KKE) of the period 1918-1956 (as the currently named KKE party is considered by OAKKE as a non-communist, social-fascist party), but under the new conditions and enriched with the experience the last 50 years and Maoism. The revolution in Greece, according to OAKKE, will be socialist in nature and anti-imperialist in form and will establish the political status of the dictatorship of the proletariat, while the broader front through which the proletariat would lead to broad democratic anti-fascist movement will be the Anti-Russian Democratic and Patriotic Front (ADIPAM). The basis of this analysis is the political line of the Third Communist International on the Antifascist Front and the Theory of Three Worlds of the Communist Party of China in the 1970s. OAKKE places great emphasis in their writing to the defense of the political heritage of the Secretary of the KKE between 1931 - 1956 Nikos Zachariadis, whom he considers, in line with the contradictory information received by Russian authorities between 1973 and 1990, but mainly based on political analysis, murdered by the leaders of the CPSU. It is also  the only organization in Greece nowadays, which maintains next to the forefront of its publications the five heads of Marx - Engels - Lenin - Stalin - Mao.

Positions

Russian social imperialism

According to the positions of OAKKE, which describes itself as a proletarian revolutionary and anti-imperialist organization, it conducts a struggle mainly against “Russian social imperialism”, which is currently considered by it the biggest threat to world peace, as was the pre-war Nazi Germany, based, as said before, on the Maoist strategy of the three worlds. The Russian social imperialism, according to OAKKE, from 1991 on, enters a new phase because the perestroika and reform "were the most profound attempts of social-fascist Russia to become autonomous from the USSR to try from that moment onwards to coil again around her a neo-tsarist empire from the ruins of the USSR. This is the era of the "dead bug" which ends today with the creation of Russian-Chinese war axis.

The neo-Nazi axis (Russia, China, Iran)

Furthermore, according to the positions of the organization, there  is an allied axis which consists of Russia - China - Iran, under the overall guidance of the first, which is, in its essence, neo-Nazi. Despite its opposition to the expansionist policy of the most chauvinistic aspects of the Israeli bourgeoisie and its support for the struggle of the Palestinian people and to gain this right to an independent state, OAKKE, unlike all the other organizations and parties in Greece with reference to the left, defends the right of Israel to defend itself against attacks received from forces such as Hamas and Hezbollah, and believes these two organizations are Islamo-Nazi and hidden arms of the neo-Nazi axis.

So, OAKKE took -in the main- the side of Israel in the battle that the latter gave in the summer of 2006 against Hezbollah, as OAKKE believes that anti-Semitism, today expressed by the request for the destruction of the state of Israel and the theory of "stateless Jewish capitalist" and "the Jewish conspiracy for world domination," will be one of the flags of the Axis in a possible global war waged against first and foremost the peoples of the world, but also against the rivals of Russia, China, and Iran, thus the western imperialists.

Productive sabotage

A key role in the analysis of the organization is played by the concept of "productive sabotage." This is defined by OAKKE as the destruction of the productive capital in Greece, through either the breaking down and closure of existing production units, often with “left” arguments (ecological, supposedly anti-capitalist, archaeological, etc.) or by preventing the investments by the local and western bourgeoisie. This attributed -by OAKKE- to the relationship of the leaders of the KKE and SYN from 1956 on, and of the prime ministers Andreas Papandreou and Costas Simitis, Kostas Karamanlis and George Papandreou with Russian social-imperialism. According to OAKKE, Andreas Papandreou, the father of the current prime minister and founder of the governing PASOK party, was one of the best Russian agents of all time.

In the OAKKE analysis, the Russians and their allies or agents in Greece do this because Russia -as an imperialist country - is economically much weaker than western imperialism, and so, whatever productive capital cannot be controlled by it,  must be damaged in order to economically and politically weaken a country, so as to subdue it. Direct or indirect relations with Russian social imperialism, based on the start of their business or other information from their business process, are attributed by OAKKE to large Greek businessmen, among them Sokratis Kokkalis, George Bobolas, Panos Germanos, Andreas Vgenopoulos etc.

Productivism

A frequent criticism made by other organizations who refer to Marxism towards OAKKE is the one of "productivism,” a theory which gives priority to the development of productive forces and not to the change of the relations of production, which was characteristic of the Mensheviks in the Russian social democracy before the Revolution of 1917 and a point of friction with the Bolsheviks. OAKKE, beyond its founding declaration of 1985, in which it refers critically to this Menshevik productivist theory, most recently has answered that the fight that it gives and that it calls people to give is not mainly for the development of the productive forces, but in the opposite for the breaking of the productive relations of the country's dependence from Russian social imperialism, ultimately from any imperialism as part of the revolutionary destruction of all capitalist relations of production and their replacement by revolutionary means with socialist relations, in the way for a world classless communist society.

Participation of Greece in the EU

Finally, another difference with the other parties of the left is that OAKKE supports strategically (since November 1995 and its 2nd Conference) the participation of Greece in the EU, on the grounds that it is a union of bourgeois states made by consensus and not with violence, that in the main the internal relations are not based on imperialist imposition of the large state to the small one but on the bourgeois democratic consensus of the 27 States, and that through this process the European proletariat is objectively released to a certain degree by the nationalism and the chauvinism of the bourgeoisie of each country. Most importantly, since 1990 and its 1st Congress, OAKKE was supporting -in terms of tactics- the eve of Greece in the then EEC (as opposed to the founding position of OAKKE in 1985, which was a direct exit from the EEC) with the notion that United Europe constitutes a mound to the two superpowers, Russia and the USA, especially to the Russians, who according to Mao Zedong, have as their first geo-strategic goal the military conquest of Western Europe.

In accordance to its position on the need to strengthen the political unification of Europe, left behind by economic integration, the organization was in favor of the Euro-constitution, unlike all the other organizations listed on the left.

Reconstruction of the world communist movement

On the question of reconstruction of the world communist movement, the OAKKE, condensing its position, notes that "the new revolutionary workers parties will now have a big mandate from their members and followers: Not to become the major new rulers of society and their executives and their members not to become the new exploiters.

This means that even from now, even the smaller new workers' parties and the most industrious young revolutionary nuclei should be applied two or three basic principles: never  “liberate” the masses against their will but to respect their own moods, never allow their members to convert their knowledge and their previous fight in authoritarianism, arrogance and material benefits but always to come under the criticism of the masses and to live like them, not to divide the workers to “ours” and  “not ours” but to unite them by an open and honest policy, even against the current and not telling everyone what he wants to hear, and above all never put any specific class interests over the general class interests and national interests over global interests of the working class.

Electoral results
Since 1989 OAKKE has participated in all national elections and European elections. In national elections in 1996 it collaborated with the “Rainbow”. In the elections of 2004 it received 5090 votes (0.08%) in the parliamentary elections of 2007, 2473 (0.03%) and the 2009 European elections 2808 (0.05).

Since 1985, OAKKE have participated in all national elections and euro-elections. The party says that fights "against the red-brown political current", the political parties that support "Russian imperialism". In the 2004 elections for the European Parliament, OAKKE took part obtaining 5,090 votes (0.08% of the total Greek vote). OAKKE in the 1996 elections formed an alliance with the Macedonian Slavs activist party, Rainbow.

1 Participated in coalition with Rainbow.

Organizations close to OAKKE

OAKKE publishes its own newspaper, New East (in Greek "Νέα Ανατολή"). Also the leading members Elias Zafiropoulos, Anna Stae and other personalities of the Greek left founded the Non Governmental Organization, Antinazi Initiative. The Trade Union wing of OAKKE, acting mainly in the ship repair zone in Perama, is ERGAS.

Antinazi Initiative, corresponds to the British antifascist Searchlight.

It publishes the monthly newspaper "New East", and wall newspapers which are posted at key points in many cities across the country by its members and friends.

See also
Politics of Greece

References

External links
Official OAKKE site, partly in English

1985 establishments in Greece
Communist parties in Greece
Far-left politics in Greece
Maoist organizations in Greece
Maoist parties
Political parties established in 1985